Fantasy Magazine is a monthly American online fantasy magazine that runs short fiction, poetry, and nonfiction (including essays and interviews).

History
Fantasy was an American online fantasy and science fiction magazine from 2005 to 2011. It was launched as a print edition at the 2005 World Fantasy Convention in Madison, Wisconsin. It continued in this format for six more issues, but in mid-October 2007, it moved online, with daily content, and spun off an original anthology, titled Fantasy. The magazine published stories by for instance Peter S. Beagle, Jeffrey Ford, Theodora Goss, Caitlin Kiernan, Joe R. Lansdale, Nick Mamatas, Tim Pratt, Cat Rambo, Ekaterina Sedia, Catherynne M. Valente, and Jeff VanderMeer.

In January 2012, Fantasy was merged into its sister Lightspeed, and John Joseph Adams replaced Sean Wallace as publisher.

Fantasy relaunched in November 2020, under editors-in-chief Arley Sorg and Christie Yant.

Awards
 Chesley Awards, Best Magazine Cover, for Renee LeCompte's work on Fantasy Magazine 3
 SciFi Weekly’s Site of the Week, for February 13, 2008
 Million Writers Award, for best online publication, 2010

References

External links 
 
  

Online magazines published in the United States
Fantasy fiction magazines
Magazines established in 2005
Magazines published in Wisconsin